Perepelkin is an alternate transcription of the Russian name Perepyolkin.

It can refer to:
 Yevgeny Perepyolkin, astronomer
 Perepelkin (lunar crater)
 Perepelkin (Martian crater)